Sielun Veljet is the 1983 debut album of the band of the same name. "Huda huda", a Tuomari Nurmio cover, was later included on the band's tribute album Otteita Tuomari Nurmion laulukirjasta.

"Yö erottaa pojasta miehen" was covered by Neljä Ruusua on the 2002 various artists tribute album Säkenöivää voimaa - tribuutti Sielun Veljille.

Track listing 
Music by Ismo Alanko, except where noted. Tracks 1-10 arranged by Sielun Veljet.
 "Hovimestari ja hymyilevät käärmeet" (Alanko, Orma, Pekkonen) -- 6:52
 "Tuulelta vastauksen saan"—3:47
 "Lammassusi"—6:22
 "Yö erottaa pojasta miehen"—3:55
 "Pieni pää"—5:19
 "Karjalan kunnailla" (Alanko, Orma) -- 3:31
 "Unelmien virtuoosi"—6:24
 "Emil Zatopek" (Alanko, Hohko, Orma) -- 3:08
 "Politiikkaa"—7:39
 "Turvaa"—5:14
 "Huda huda" (Nurmio) -- 3:58

Track 4 was originally misprinted as "Yö erottaa pojan miehestä" on the album's liner notes.

Personnel 
 Ismo Alanko -- vocals, guitar, bass
 Jukka Orma—guitar, vocals, saxophone
 Jouko Hohko—guitar, bass, vocals
 Alf Forsman -- drums
 Jouni Mömmö = synthesizer (credited as "weird sounds")

Notes 

1983 debut albums
Sielun Veljet albums